The Most International titles in women's handball is a list of women's handball teams around the world with most international titles representing all the International Handball Federation Affiliated Confederations such as the Asian Handball Federation (AHF), African Handball Confederation (CAHB), European Handball Federation (EHF), North America and the Caribbean Handball Confederation (NACHC), Oceania Continent Handball Federation (OCHF), and the South and Central America Handball Confederation (SCAHC).

Regional Titles are not accounted in this list because it does not affiliated with the International Handball Federation Competitions.

Top 10

Countries with most teams in top 10

Countries with most titles in top 10

References

External link
International Handball Federation - IHF
Handball Archive - todor66.com

Handball-related lists